Seppo Kalervo Lampela (born 1976 in Helsinki, Finland), professionally known as Steen1, is a Finnish rap musician. He originally chose the name Steen Christensen, after the Danish criminal who shot two Finnish policemen in 1997, as his moniker, but changed it due to controversy.

In 2004 Steen1 released his debut album entitled Salaliittoteoria (Conspiracy Theory). In September 2005 his second full-length, Varasta pomolta (Steal from the Boss) was released. His lyrics tend to feature aggressive, anti-establishment social critique. His Rap song "Terroristi" (Terrorist) was in the Finnish teen movie Tyttö sinä olet tähti (Girl You're a Star) and his rap song "Sinisiä rappuja ja punaisia hintalappuja" ("Blue blocks and red price tags") was in the movie Paha maa (Frozen Land)

Steen1 ran for the Parliament of Finland in the 2007 elections representing the Communist Party of Finland (SKP). He received the most votes among SKP candidates, but failed to get elected.

Discography

Albums
Salaliittoteoria (2004)
Varasta pomolta (2005)
Ajatusrikoksia (compilation, 2007)
Runoja kontrollihuoneesta (2009)
Pesismaila ja Ananas (under the moniker Liekehtivä sikiö)(2009)
Bensaahan ne pojat tuli hakemaan (with Jussi Lampi) (2011)
Jedin paluu (2011)

Singles
Samaa uudestaan (feat. Saimaa) (2005)
Terroristi (feat. Asa) (2006)
Marssi (feat. Iso H & Redrama) (2007)
Tennispallobiisi (With Jussi Lampi) (2011)
 Itä-Helsinki (2012)

EPs
Nottinghamin paskasheriffi (2006)
Valkoinen jänis (2007)
Paskasheriffin paluu (2010)

Bibliography
Hullu klovni - 2008

References

External links
Official site (in Finnish)

1976 births
Living people
Musicians from Helsinki
Finnish rappers